1866 in sports describes the year's events in world sport.

Association football
Events
 Foundation of Upton Park F.C.

Athletics
Events
 The Amateur Athletics Club (AAC) is founded and becomes the governing body of athletics in the United Kingdom, hosting the first national championships and introducing a definition of "amateur" that will determine eligibility for athletics competitions until the late 20th century.

Baseball
National championship
 National Association of Base Ball Players champion – Brooklyn Atlantics
Events
 National Association membership triples and geographic scope explodes, from Fort Leavenworth, Kansas to Portland, Maine. The association hears cases of professionalism at the center and there is no longer a clear and official NABBP champion.

Boxing
Events
 6 August — Jem Mace defeats Joe Goss in the 21st round and reclaims the vacant English Championship.
 19 September — Mike McCoole defeats Bill Davis in the 34th round at Rhodes Point, near St Louis, and underlines his claim to the American Championship.  The third claimant Jimmy Elliott does not fight anyone this year.

Cricket
Events
 George Wootton's tally of 119 wickets establishes a new record for an English season.
England
 Most runs – Harry Jupp 1,140 @ 31.66 (HS 165)
 Most wickets – George Wootton 119 @ 14.09 (BB 8–69)

Golf
Major tournaments
 British Open – Willie Park senior

Horse racing
Events
 Inaugural running of the Irish Derby Stakes at The Curragh is won by Selim
England
 Grand National – Salamander
 1,000 Guineas Stakes – Repulse 
 2,000 Guineas Stakes – Lord Lyon
 The Derby – Lord Lyon
 The Oaks – Tormentor 
 St. Leger Stakes – Lord Lyon
Australia  
 Melbourne Cup – The Barb
Canada
 Queen's Plate – Beacon
Ireland
 Irish Derby Stakes – Selim

Rowing
The Boat Race
 24 March — Oxford wins the 23rd Oxford and Cambridge Boat Race

Rugby football
Events
 Foundation of Harlequins FC, Rochdale Hornets and Swinton RLFC

Yacht racing
The American schooners Vesta, Henrietta and Fleetwing cross the Atlantic Ocean from Sandy Hook to the Needles, Isle of Wight in the first organised offshore race. The Henrietta, owned by 21-year-old James Gordon Bennett, Jr., and captained by Samuel S. Samuels won the race in 13 days, 21 hours and 55 minutes.

References

 
Sports by year